Conizonia is a genus of longhorn beetles of the subfamily Lamiinae, containing the following species:

subgenus Conizonia
 Conizonia allardi Fairmaire, 1866
 Conizonia aresteni Pic, 1951
 Conizonia detrita (Fabricius, 1793)
 Conizonia guerinii (Breme, 1840)
 Conizonia kubani Holzschuh, 1991
 Conizonia mounai Sama, 2005
 Conizonia simia Sama, 2005
 Conizonia warnieri (Lucas, 1849)

subgenus Conizonioides
 Conizonia kalashiani Danilevsky, 1992

subgenus Eurycoptosia
 Conizonia bodoani (Pic, 1912)

subgenus Iranocoptosia
 Conizonia fausti (Ganglbauer, 1885)

subgenus Pteromallosia
 Conizonia albolineata (Hampe, 1852)
 Conizonia anularis Holzschuh, 1984

References

Saperdini